Aneuretinae is a subfamily of ants consisting of a single extant species, Aneuretus simoni (Sri Lankan relict ant), and 9 fossil species. Earlier, the phylogenetic position of A. simoni was thought to be intermediate between primitive and advanced subfamilies of ants, but recent studies have shown it is the nearest living relative of subfamily Dolichoderinae.

Genera
Aneuretini Emery, 1913
†Aneuretellus Dlussky, 1988
Aneuretus Emery, 1893
†Mianeuretus Carpenter, 1930
†Paraneuretus Wheeler, 1915
†Protaneuretus Wheeler, 1915
†Pityomyrmecini Wheeler, 1915
†Pityomyrmex Wheeler, 1915
incertae sedis
†Britaneuretus Dlussky & Perfilieva, 2014
†Cananeuretus Engel & Grimaldi, 2005

Burmomyrma was formerly placed here, but is actually an ant-mimic wasp.

References

Sources cited

External links

 
Ant subfamilies
Taxa named by Carlo Emery